Meghani (Gujarati મેઘાણી, Hindi मेघाणी) is a Gujarati surname. It is judged by the Oxford Dictionary of Family Names in Britain and Ireland 'probably' to originate in the Sanskrit word मेघ (megha, 'cloud') combined with the adjectival suffix -ani, implying a name meaning 'to do with cloud' or, more likely, since Megha can also be a personal name, 'descended from Megha'. The dictionary notes that 'this name is also found among people from Sind, Pakistan, who have migrated into India'. The name is associated with the Lohana caste. As of about 2016, 219 people bore the name in Great Britain and none in Ireland.

People
Notable people with the name include:

Jayant Meghani (1938–2020), Indian editor and translator from Gujarat
Jhaverchand Meghani (1896-1947), Indian poet, writer, social reformer and freedom fighter from Gujarat

References

Surnames of Indian origin
Hindu surnames